Swattenden is a small settlement in the parish of Cranbrook and Sissinghurst in England. 

It is situated on the B2086 (Swattenden Lane) about a mile from Hartley, where the A229 crosses the settlement. At Swattenden, one can find an agricultural/country shop, a fruit farm, fishing centre, and the Swattenden Centre.

Swattenden House
Swattenden House is a mansion built in 1860. It was the site of Swattenden Secondary School for Boys which moved to Angley School in 1972. It then became the "Swattenden Centre", a Kent County Council residential education centre, in 1976.

Toponymy
The suffix -enden is found in many place names in the Kentish Weald, meaning the pasture or clearing in the forest belonging to the people of a named person. Here the person was called Swaeðel. In 1240, the Old English Swaeðeling denn, was written as Swetlingdenn, in 1260 it was spelled Swetlyngdenne and in 1305 Swethyngden.

References

External links
The Swattenden Centre

Villages in Kent